Obereopsis togoensis is a species of beetle in the family Cerambycidae. It was described by Stephan von Breuning in 1961. It is known from Togo.

References

togoensis
Beetles described in 1961